Robert Hare may refer to:

Robert Hare (antiquary) (died 1611), MP for Dunwich
Robert Hare (chemist) (1781–1858), American chemist who developed the gas blowpipe and the Deflagrator
Robert D. Hare (born 1934), Canadian criminal psychologist